Sticholotidinae is a beetle subfamily in the family Coccinellidae (lady beetles).

References

External links 
 
 

Coccinellidae
Beetle subfamilies